

List by State

Alabama

Alaska

American Samoa

Arizona

Arkansas

C

California

Colorado

Connecticut

D

Delaware

District of Columbia

F

Florida

A seventh VA Medical Center for Florida has been confirmed for construction in Orlando.  It may be ready as early as 2011.

G

Georgia

Guam

H

Hawaii

I

Idaho

Illinois

Indiana

Iowa

K

Kansas

Kentucky

L

Louisiana

M

Maine

Maryland

Massachusetts

Michigan

Minnesota

Mississippi

Missouri

Montana

N

Nebraska

Nevada

New Hampshire

New Jersey

New Mexico

New York

North Carolina

North Dakota

O

Ohio

Oklahoma

Oregon

P

Pennsylvania

Puerto Rico

R

Rhode Island

S

South Carolina

South Dakota

T

Tennessee

Texas

U

Utah

V

Vermont

Virginia

Virgin Islands

W

Washington

West Virginia

Wisconsin

Wyoming

References

Veterans' affairs in the United States
United States Department of Veterans Affairs